Stafford railway station is a major interchange railway station in Stafford, Staffordshire, England, and is the second busiest railway station in Staffordshire, after Stoke-on-Trent. The station serves the county town, as well as surrounding villages. The station lies on the junction of the Trent Valley Line, the Birmingham Loop/Rugby-Birmingham-Stafford Line, and the West Coast Main Line.

Stafford station also formerly served the now defunct Stafford to Uttoxeter and Stafford to Shrewsbury lines.

The current brutalist station building was built in 1962, and is the fourth station to have existed on this site. The interior of the station was refurbished in 2015, which allowed the station to have a new WHSmith store and an improved ticket office.

History

The first station was built by the Grand Junction Railway and opened in July 1837. It soon became inadequate and was replaced by a second station in 1844. A third station was built in 1862, which was eventually replaced by the current concrete Brutalist building in 1962, built as part of the modernisation programme which saw the electrification of the West Coast Main Line.

Lines originally built by the Stafford and Uttoxeter Railway and the Shropshire Union Railways and Canal Company (to Shrewsbury) also used the station. The Stafford to Uttoxeter line closed to passenger traffic in 1939, with the Shrewsbury line closing as part of the Beeching Axe in 1964.

Following the rebuilding of the station between 1961 and 1962 by the architect William Robert Headley, Isabel, a narrow gauge engine built by local firm WG Bagnall, stood on a plinth on the opposite side of Station Road, at the junction of Railway Street, until it was removed in the mid-1980s. It is now on the Amerton Railway.

Incidents and accidents

Two accidents have happened at Stafford since 1990:
 On 4 August 1990, an out-of-service train heading to a depot in Birmingham crashed into the back of an express train bound for Penzance on platform 4 at Stafford station. The driver was killed and 36 people were injured.
 On 8 March 1996, a mail train collided with a freight train carrying liquid carbon dioxide just south of Stafford. A mail sorter was killed and another 22 people were injured. The mail train Class 86 locomotive was catapulted up the embankment and came to rest against a house.

The station today

There are five platforms in use at the station, all of which are accessible from either of the main lines that converge from the south.  Platform 1 is usually used for services to London Euston and platform 3 for services from London Euston towards Liverpool and Crewe. Platform 4 is usually used for trains towards Birmingham New Street and the West of England. Platform 5 is usually used for services towards Manchester and Wales. Finally, platform 6 is usually used for trains starting/terminating towards/from London Euston, Birmingham New Street, Northampton, Stoke-on-Trent, Crewe and Liverpool Lime Street.

The Stafford Area Improvements Programme improved the track layout around the station so that trains are no longer bound to a platform based upon direction of travel and trains can now use any platform, regardless of direction.

Platform 6 used to be the terminus of the Chase Line, however it now terminates at Rugeley Trent Valley. The platform is also sometimes used for railtours, hence why the platform is split into 'a' and 'b' sections.

The former bay platform 2 is no longer used by passenger trains. When Virgin Trains operated the InterCity West Coast franchise, platform 2 served as a stable for their Class 57 rescue locomotives; this role is now redundant. Occasionally, the bay platform stables other locomotives from freight operators.

The westernmost platform, unofficially known as platform 7, was formerly used by Royal Mail to load mail from the sorting office next door to the platform. This practice has since ended and now the westernmost platform has been converted into a single goods line, with bi-directional operation. This was completed during the bank holiday weekend of 29–31 August 2015.

In October 2012, Network Rail began refurbishment works at the station due to the poor condition of some of the structures. The work included resurfacing the platforms (platforms 1 and 3 had been completed before the works), improving surface and roof drainage, renewing the opaque glazing on the footbridge, installing new canopy roof covers on the platforms and some structural work on the platform supports.

In June 2015, Virgin Trains unveiled £1 million plans to refurbish the entrance, ticket hall and foyer. The work started in November in the same year and was anticipated to be completed within 20 weeks. These were completed March 2016. The changes saw the number of ticket machines at the station double, WHSmith relocation of the travel centre to the current ticket purchasing area and Starbucks took the place of Pumpkin Café Shop. The cafe was also shortened to allow an increased size of the waiting area.

Current facilities
Currently, the station has many facilities which are typical of those across the Avanti West Coast Network; this includes a ticket office, toilets, car park, coffee shop and newsagent.

Stafford Area Improvements Programme 
The Stafford Area Improvements Programme by Network Rail aims to allow more trains to run and also aims to reduce journey times by removing key bottlenecks in the area around Stafford.

The programme included large scale building works, north of Stafford station in Norton Bridge, Staffordshire, where a flyover was implemented to allow faster train services, and removed the need to slow down before entering the junction.

Other benefits of the programme, were the introduction of bi-directional signals at Stafford Station, which meant that trains can now use any platform, regardless of direction of travel.

Stafford resignalling 

The resignalling aspect of the programme was completed over the bank holiday weekend of 29–31 August 2015.  All platforms now have bi-directional signalling, and the goods loop is now operational.

The resignalling programme meant that Stafford signal boxes would be closed, and trains would be controlled from the Rugby Rail Operating Centre (ROC). The last train was signalled from Stafford in the early hours of 29 August 2015, and the first train was signalled from Rugby ROC on the morning of 1 September 2015.

Regular services

From the south, two branches of the West Coast Main Line meet here: the Trent Valley and the Birmingham lines.

The station is currently served by frequent operators: Avanti West Coast, CrossCountry and London North Western. Usual off-peak services at Stafford follow a pattern such as the one below:

Southbound rail services
 3tph to Birmingham New Street (semi-fast). Operated by London Northwestern Railway
 1tph to London Euston (semi-fast). Operated by London Northwestern Railway.
 1tph to London Euston only. Operated by Avanti West Coast.
Operated by CrossCountry.
Operated by CrossCountry.

Northbound rail services
 1tph to Liverpool Lime Street (fast). Operated by Avanti West Coast.
 1tph to Crewe only. Operated by London Northwestern Railway.
 2tph to Liverpool Lime Street (semi-fast). Operated by London Northwestern Railway. 
 2tph to Manchester Piccadilly. Operated by CrossCountry.
 1tph to Crewe via  and Stoke. Operated by London Northwestern Railway.
Other services which do not operate on a regular basis are also present at Stafford, including other Avanti West Coast services (e.g. towards Preston and Scotland).

Future services
Under current proposals, Stafford will be a part of the High Speed 2 network, via a 'Classic Compatible' junction, which will allow HS2 trains to operate to Stafford and further on towards Liverpool. This would shorten journey times from Stafford to London to an estimated 53 minutes. Under current proposals, it is expected that an hourly service will operate in both directions; however, it is currently unclear if these services will terminate at Stafford or Liverpool.

In addition, under current plans, the HS2 depot will be north of Stafford in Yarnfield.

There have also been proposals to reintroduce services to terminate on the Chase Line, which was cutback to Rugeley Trent Valley in 2008 as well a significant increase in the frequency of local services using the additional capacity which will become available post HS2.

References
Lewis, Roy (1996). Staffordshire Railway Stations on old picture postcards (reprinted 2002). Nottingham: Reflections of a Bygone Age.

Sources

Further reading

External links

Railway stations in Staffordshire
DfT Category C1 stations
Buildings and structures in Stafford
Former London and North Western Railway stations
Railway stations in Great Britain opened in 1837
Railway stations served by CrossCountry
Railway stations served by Avanti West Coast
Railway stations served by West Midlands Trains
1837 establishments in England
William Robert Headley railway stations
Stations on the West Coast Main Line